Francis Robinson Phelps (19 September 1863 – 26 June 1938) was an Anglican bishop in the first half of the 20th century.

Early life 

Phelps was born in Canada on 19 September 1863 and educated at Keble College, Oxford. he was made deacon in 1887 and ordained priest in 1888. Following curacies at Battersea, St John the Evangelist, Westminster and St John the Divine, Kennington he was rector of Thorpe Episcopi, Norfolk.

South Africa 

Phelps and his family emigrated to South Africa in 1909, he was successively warden of St Peter’s Home in Grahamstown and Archdeacon of Grahamstown. He was appointed Dean of  Grahamstown in 1914.

Phelps was elected Bishop of Grahamstown in 1915.   In 1931 he was translated to Cape Town. His consecration as archbishop was challenged by other Anglican clergy in the civil court in Cape Town.  The court found for Phelps.

Due to ill-health Phelps resigned as archbishop in 1937, He died less than a year later on 27 June 1938. in Oxford.

Phelps married Edith Hunter in 1895.

References

Citations

Sources

External links 

 
 University of the Witwatersrand papers
 National Archives

1863 births
Alumni of Keble College, Oxford
Anglican archdeacons in Africa
Anglican bishops of Grahamstown
Anglican archbishops of Cape Town
20th-century Anglican Church of Southern Africa bishops
20th-century Anglican archbishops
1938 deaths
Deans of Grahamstown